Marie-Geneviève Raphaëlle Halévy-Bizet-Straus (26 February 1849 – 22 December 1926) was a French salonnière who was the wife of Georges Bizet. She inspired Marcel Proust as a model for the Duchesse de Guermantes and Odette de Crécy in À la recherche du temps perdu.

Life
Geneviève Halévy was born in Paris as the youngest daughter of the composer Jacques-Fromental Halévy and his wife Léonie (née Rodrigues-Henriques), both Jewish. Geneviève Halévy's youth was sad: She lost her father when she was 13 years old, her elder sister when she was 15 years old, and her mother suffered from periods of mental instability. In 1869, she married Georges Bizet, a pupil of her father, and gave birth in 1871 to their son Jacques, who became a school friend of Marcel Proust. Bizet died suddenly of a heart attack in 1875. 

Shortly after his death, Geneviève and Élie-Miriam Delaborde, a close friend of both her and Bizet, signed a marriage contract. Despite this, they never went through with the marriage.  There have been speculations by scholars that Geneviève and Delaborde were having an affair during her marriage to Bizet, a theory seemingly confirmed by their marriage contract a year after Bizet's death.  

Geneviève moved to live with her uncle, Léon Halévy, and opened a salon for her cousin Ludovic Halévy, where she helped him in receiving the artistic society of the time. This was known as Ludovic's Thursdays (Les jeudis de Ludovic). After a few years, she opened her own salon where distinguished society members, such as Baron and Baronness Alphonse de Rothschild, Comtesse Potocka, Duchesse de Richelieu, and Comtesse de Chevigné (née de Sade, another model for the Duchesse de Guermantes) could meet with writers and intellectuals such as Guy de Maupassant, Henri Meilhac, Georges de Porto-Riche, Paul Bourget, Paul Hervieu, Joseph Reinach, and her cousin Ludovic. 

In 1886, she married the lawyer Émile Straus, an acquaintance of the Rothschild family, and her salon became increasingly fashionable: She received Robert de Montesquiou and his cousin Comtesse Greffulhe, painters and journalists. Many supporters of Dreyfus socialized at Mme Straus's salon, including Marcel Proust, who was one of the first intellectuals to sign a petition in L'Aurore at the time of the Dreyfus Affair. After the Affair, the salon became less prominent. 

After 1910, Mme Straus became increasingly depressed, and removed herself from society. Her son committed suicide in 1922. A few weeks later, Proust died. She died in 1926 in Paris, aged 77.

References

Sources 
Andrée Jacob, Il y a un siècle, quand les dames tenaient salon, Paris, Ed. Arnaud Seydoux, 1991
Painter, George Duncan: Marcel Proust: a biography, London, Chatto & Windus, 1959

Halevy, Genevieve
Halevy, Genevieve
Halevy, Genevieve
Halevy, Genevieve
Halevy, Genevieve
French people of Portuguese-Jewish descent